The 1962 United States Senate special election in Wyoming was held on November 6, 1962. Following the death of Senator-elect Keith Thomson after his election to the Senate in 1960, Democratic Governor John J. Hickey appointed himself to fill the vacancy. A special election was held to fill the remaining four years of the term in 1962, and Hickey faced a strong challenge from former Republican Governor Milward Simpson in a rematch of the 1958 gubernatorial election. Despite a political environment largely favorable to Democrats nationwide, Democratic candidates faced strong headwinds in Wyoming. Senator Hickey overwhelmingly lost re-election to Simpson as Democratic Governor Jack R. Gage lost re-election by a wide margin, as well. Hickey was the last Democratic Senator from Wyoming to serve after Gale McGee began his tenure, though McGee remained the last remaining.

Democratic primary

Candidates
 John J. Hickey, incumbent U.S. Senator

Results

Republican Primary

Candidates
 Milward Simpson, former Governor of Wyoming
 Kenny Sailors, basketball player, former State Representative

Results

General election

Results

References

Wyoming
1962
1962 Wyoming elections
Wyoming 1962
Wyoming 1962
United States Senate 1962